The Birth of Venus is a 1907 painting by the French artist Henri Gervex. It is now in the Petit Palais, in Paris.

References

Paintings of Venus
1907 paintings
Nude art
French paintings
Paintings in the collection of the Petit Palais
Water in art